Goh Kun (Hangul: 고건, Hanja: 高建, born January 2, 1938) is a South Korean politician who was Prime Minister of South Korea from 1997 to 1998 and again from 2003 to 2004. He was also the acting President of South Korea at the time of Roh Moo-hyun's suspension.

Career
Goh began his career in civil service in the 1960s, when he joined the Ministry of Home Affairs as a probationary officer. He was promoted through various positions, including the Governor of South Jeolla (1975–1979), the Minister of Transportation (1980–1981) and Minister of Agriculture and Fisheries (1981–1982).

In 1985, Goh was elected as a Member of Parliament, before being appointed the mayor of Seoul from 1988 to 1990. He was later elected mayor of Seoul from 1998 to 2002.

He served as Prime Minister of South Korea from 1997 to 1998 and from 2003 to 2004.

He assumed the role of interim President following President Roh Moo-Hyun's impeachment, from March 12, 2004 until May 14, 2004, when the South Korean Constitutional Court overturned the impeachment decision and restored Roh's powers as President. He resigned from the office of Prime Minister on May 24, 2004 after refusing to comply with the President's request to replace cabinet members.

In June 2006, Goh announced his candidacy for the presidential race.

On January 16, 2007, he announced that he would no longer be a candidate for the presidential elections and that he would retire from political life. Despite his retirement, he was named head of social unity council by President Lee Myung-bak on December 21, 2009.

See also 
 Impeachment of Roh Moo-hyun

References

External links
  - JoongAng Daily (September 12, 2005)
 "Constitutional Court Reinstates South Korea's Impeached President" - NY Times (May 14, 2004)
 "North Korea Appeals for Help After Railway Explosion" - NY Times (April 24, 2004)
 "3,000 Casualties Reported in North Korean Rail Blast" - NY Times (April 23, 2004)
 "Impeachment Case to Go Forward in Seoul" - NY Times (April 17, 2004)
 "Bullet Train Remakes Map of South Korea" - NY Times (April 2, 2004)
 "Acting President Goh Kun Holds First Cabinet Meeting" - Chosun Ilbo (March 15, 2004)
 "A Steady Hand Promises Calm Amid the Furor In South Korea" - NY Times (March 14, 2004)
 "President's Impeachment Stirs Angry Protests in South Korea" - NY Times (March 13, 2004)
 "Goh Says Firmer Stance Against North to Stay" - Chosun Ilbo (May 19, 2003)
 "Korea Can't Afford to Cop Out on Corporate Reform" - Bloomberg Businessweek (March 30, 2003)
 "Threats and Responses: Seoul; Musing on an Exodus of G.I.'s, South Korea Hails U.S. Presence" - NY Times (March 8, 2003)
 "South Korea's New President Gets His Choice for Prime Minister" - NY Times (February 27, 2003)
 "Goh Kun" - Bloomberg Businessweek (July 1, 2001)
 "Seoul's Web of Anti-Correption" - Bloomberg Businessweek (June 24, 2001)

1938 births
Acting presidents of South Korea
Living people
Mayors of Seoul
Seoul National University alumni
Government ministers of South Korea
Democratic Party (South Korea, 2000) politicians
20th-century South Korean politicians
21st-century South Korean politicians